Bücker-Flugzeugbau GmbH was a German aircraft manufacturer founded in 1932. It was most notable for Its highly regarded sports planes which went on to be used as trainers by the Luftwaffe during World War II.

History
With the sale of this business at the end of 1932, Bücker returned to his native Germany where he opened his new factory in Johannisthal, Berlin in 1934, but moved to a new built bigger factory in Rangsdorf in 1935.

Bücker's three great successes were the Bücker Bü 131 Jungmann (1934), the Bü 133 Jungmeister (1936) and the Bü 181 Bestmann (1939). As well as these, the company built designs from several other manufacturers under licence, including the Focke-Wulf Fw 44, the DFS 230, and components for the Focke-Wulf Fw 190, Junkers Ju 87, and Henschel Hs 293.

During the war, forced labour was used at the Bücker works. Up to 500 prisoners from the Soviet Union lived in a nearby prison camp under bad conditions; there were also forced labourers from France, Italy, and other countries.

At the end of World War II, the company’s premises fell into the Soviet occupation zone, and were seized. The company was then broken up. The Soviet army used the premises for aviation maintenance until their withdrawal from Germany in the 1990s.

The Bü 181 continued to be built in Czechoslovakia and Egypt after the war.

List of aircraft
Bücker Bü 131 Jungmann (Young Man) (1934) single-engine two-seat trainer, biplane
Bücker Bü 133 Jungmeister (Young Champion) (1935) single-engine one-seat advanced trainer/aerobatic, biplane
Bücker Bü 134 monoplane (prototype)
Bücker Bü 180 Student (1937) single-engine two-seat trainer, low-wing monoplane
Bücker Bü 181 Bestmann (Bestman) (1939) single-engine two-seat trainer/utility, low-wing monoplane
Bücker Bü 182 Kornett

See also
List of aircraft manufacturers
List of RLM aircraft designations
Volksflugzeug

References

Notes

Bibliography

 Rieger, Klaus-Jochen and Rieger, Christoph. Faszination Bücker Flugzeuge (Fascination Bücker Aircraft) (bilingual German/English). Germany: MeinFachverlag, 2014. .
 König, Erwin. Die Bücker-Flugzeuge (The Bücker Aircraft) (bilingual German/English). Martinsried, Germany: Nara Verlag, 1987. .
 König, Erwin. Die Bückers, Die Geschichte der ehemaligen Bücker-Flugzeugbau-GmbH und ihrer Flugzeuge (in German). (1979)
 Wietstruk, Siegfried. Bücker-Flugzeugbau, Die Geschichte eines Flugzeugwerkes (in German). D-82041 Oberhaching, Germany: Aviatik Verlag, 1999. .

Defunct aircraft manufacturers of Germany
Defunct aircraft engine manufacturers of Germany
Companies based in Brandenburg
Companies of Prussia
 
Unfree labor during World War II